Emeritus Professor Edwin Thomas (Ted) Brown AC FIEAust FREng FTSE (born 4 December 1938, Castlemaine, Victoria Australia) is an Australian mining and civil engineer acknowledged as a world expert in the field of rock mechanics.

His academic career spanned 36 years from 1965 to 2001. He received a Ph.D. from the University of Queensland in 1969, a D.Sc. (Engineering) from the University of London in 1985, he was lecturer and Associate Professor at James Cook University, then Reader and Professor of Rock Mechanics at the Imperial College of Science and Technology in London (1975–1987), serving as Dean of the Royal School of Mines 1983–1986. On return to Australia, he became Dean of Engineering at the University of Queensland. He was appointed an Emeritus Professor in 2001.

References

1938 births
Australian civil engineers
Australian mining engineers
University of Queensland alumni
Academic staff of the University of Queensland
Academic staff of James Cook University
Living people
Fellows of the Australian Academy of Technological Sciences and Engineering
Deans of the Royal School of Mines